Ivaylo Vasilev is a Bulgarian professional football coach and former player who last served as the head coach of Levski Lom.

References

External links
 Profile at Akademik Sofia

1987 births
Living people
Bulgarian footballers
Akademik Sofia players
Association football defenders
First Professional Football League (Bulgaria) players